EIROforum (European Intergovernmental Research Organisation forum) is an organization consisting of eight European intergovernmental scientific research organisations devoted to fostering mutual activities. Presided upon by the Director Generals of the individual organizations, who meet twice a year. the organization aims to identify mutual activities amongst its members to share resources in various fields.

The eight EIROforum members are:
 CERN - European Organization for Nuclear Research 
 EUROfusion
 EMBL - European Molecular Biology Laboratory
 ESA - European Space Agency
 ESO - European Organisation for Astronomical Research in the Southern Hemisphere
 ESRF - European Synchrotron Radiation Facility
 European XFEL - European XFEL Free-Electron Laser Facility
 ILL - Institut Laue-Langevin

Major Activities
The EIROforum plays a crucial role to establish a European Research Area.  It works closely both with the European Union and national institutions and actively participates in shaping science policy in Europe. The member organisations engage in cutting-edge research activities and pool their substantial expertise in basic research resources by interacting to find common synergies. 

The five major areas of activity are:
 Science Policy
 Research Collaborations
 Outreach and Education
 Human Resources
 Technology

Some of its major achievements has been to provide input to shaping a scientific research policy in Europe as part of the new treaty. In the technology area, for instance, Grid technology, amongst other IT technologies has been a driving force to bring closer collaboration on the sharing of a common infrastructure for the benefit of various fields of the member organizations; in particular: nuclear physics, astronomy and  microbiology.

External links
EIROforum
Article in European Commission's Magazine on European Research

References

International organizations based in Europe